Mairie d'Aubervilliers is the northern terminus of line 12 of the Paris Métro. The station is located near Aubervilliers town hall and opened on 31 May 2022. In the future, it will be served by line 15 as part of the Grand Paris Express Project.

Gallery

References

Paris Métro line 12
Paris Métro line 15
Paris Métro stations in Aubervilliers
Railway stations in France opened in 2022